Andrey Kucheryavykh (born 24 September 1970) is a Kazakhstani football coach and a former player. He is an assistant coach of Russian club Irtysh Omsk.

Career

Coaching
In July 2019, Kucheryavykh was appointed as a coach at Irtysh Omsk.

Career statistics

International

International goals

Scores and results list Tajikistan's goal tally first, score column indicates score after each Tajikistan goal.

Honours
Ansat Pavlodar
Kazakhstan Premier League (1): 1993

Kairat
Kazakhstan Cup (1): 1997

Irtysh Pavlodar
Kazakhstan Premier League (3): 1997, 2002, 2003
Kazakhstan Cup (1): 1998

References

External links
 

Living people
1970 births
Kazakhstani footballers
Association football defenders
Association football midfielders
Kazakhstan international footballers
Kazakhstan Premier League players
FC Irtysh Pavlodar players
FC Kairat players
FC Kyzylzhar players
Kazakhstani football managers
Kazakhstani expatriate football managers
Expatriate football managers in Russia
Kazakhstani expatriate sportspeople in Russia
People from Pavlodar